Thomas Bidegain is a French screenwriter, producer and film director. He is noted for his collaborations with the director Jacques Audiard. He received the César Award for Best Original Screenplay in 2010 for A Prophet and Best Adaptation in 2013 for Rust and Bone; both awards were shared with Audiard. Bidegain's directorial debut The Cowboys premiered in the Directors' Fortnight section at the 2015 Cannes Film Festival.

Filmography

Director

 The Cowboys (Les Cowboys) (2015)
 Selfie (segment "Vlog")  (2020)
 Soudain seuls (2023?)

Screenwriter
 À boire (2004), directed by Marion Vernoux
 A Prophet (Un prophète) (2009), directed by Jacques Audiard 
 Rust and Bone (De rouille et d'os) (2012), directed by Jacques Audiard 
 Our Children (À perdre la raison) (2012), directed by Joachim Lafosse
 Saint Laurent (2014), directed by Bertrand Bonello
 La Famille Bélier (2014), directed by Eric Lartigau
 Through the Air (La Résistance de l'air) (2015), directed by Fred Grivois
 The Wakhan Front (Ni le ciel ni la terre) (2015), directed by Clément Cogitore
 Dheepan (2015), directed by Jacques Audiard
 The White Knights (Les Chevaliers blancs) (2015), collaboration, directed by Joachim Lafosse
 The Dancer (La Danseuse) (2016), directed by Stéphanie Di Giusto
 The Racer and the Jailbird (Le Fidèle) (2017), directed by Michaël R. Roskam
 The Sisters Brothers (Les Frères Sisters) (2018), directed by Jacques Audiard
 Lady Winsley (Lady Winsley'i Kim Öldürdü) (2019), directed by Hiner Saleem
 The Bears' Famous Invasion of Sicily (La Fameuse Invasion des ours en Sicile) (2019), directed by Lorenzo Mattotti
 #Iamhere (#jesuislà) (2019), directed by Éric Lartigau
 Stillwater (2021), directed by Tom McCarthy
 The Salamander (La Salamandre) (2021), directed by Alexandre Carvalho
 Notre-Dame on Fire (Notre-Dame brûle) (2022), directed by Jean-Jacques Annaud
 Une zone à défendre (2023), directed by Romain Cogitore

References

External links

 

César Award winners
French film directors
French film producers
French male screenwriters
French screenwriters
French-language film directors
Living people
Year of birth missing (living people)